Zambia, officially known as the Republic of Zambia, is a landlocked country in Southern Africa. The neighbouring countries are the Democratic Republic of the Congo to the north, Tanzania to the north-east, Malawi to the east, Mozambique, Zimbabwe, Botswana, and Namibia to the south, and Angola to the west. The capital city is Lusaka, located in the southeast of the country. The population is concentrated mainly around the capital and the Copperbelt to the northwest.

Lists of Zambia-related topics include:

 List of airports in Zambia
 List of birds of Zambia
 Cities – see List of settlements in Zambia
 List of Zambian companies
Historical figures – see List of Zambians
 List of mammals in Zambia
 List of national parks of Zambia
People – see List of Zambians
 List of political parties in Zambia
Politicians – see List of Zambians
 List of presidents of Zambia
 List of schools in Zambia
 List of settlements in Zambia
Athletes – see List of Zambians
Towns – see List of settlements in Zambia
 List of vice presidents of Zambia
 List of Zambian parliamentary constituencies
 List of Zambians
 List of Zambia-related topics

See also 
 List of Zambia-related topics
 List of Zambia-related articles (alphabetical index)